James Annesley, 2nd Earl of Anglesey FRS (c. 1645 – 1 April 1690), styled Lord Annesley from 1661 to 1686, was a British peer.

He was the son of Arthur Annesley, 1st Earl of Anglesey and Elizabeth Altham. 
He matriculated at Christ Church, Oxford University, on 4 December 1661.

He married Lady Elizabeth Manners, daughter of John Manners, 8th Earl of Rutland and Frances Montagu, on 17 September 1669. They had children:
James Annesley, 3rd Earl of Anglesey (13 July 1674 -  21 January 1701/2);
John Annesley, 4th Earl of Anglesey (18 January 1676 - 18 September 1710);
Arthur Annesley, 5th Earl of Anglesey (1677, 1683 - 1 April 1737).

He died intestate and the administration of his estate in England and Ireland, with a value estimated at £4,000 per annum, was granted to his widow on 6 June 1690.

He was briefly a Whig member of parliament for County Waterford in 1666, after his brother-in-law, Richard Power succeeded in his father's (Irish) peerage. He was elected to the English seat of Winchester in the parliaments of May and October 1679, and again in 1681. He was a Justice of the Peace for Hampshire and Surrey (1674–81), colonel of the Hampshire militia (1675–81), Custos Rotulorum of Hampshire(1675–81) and a Deputy Lieutenant of Hampshire (1680–81).

On 6 April 1686 Annesley succeeded to his father's peerages of Baron Mountnorris and Earl of Anglesey, in Wales [E., 1661], Baron Annesley, of Newport Pagnel, Buckinghamshire [E., 1661] and Viscount Valentia.

References

External links

1645 births
1690 deaths
2
Original Fellows of the Royal Society
James
Annesley, James
Annesley, James
Annesley, James
Annesley, James
Annesley, James
Alumni of Christ Church, Oxford
Members of the Parliament of Ireland (pre-1801) for County Waterford constituencies